Afroploce ealana is a species of moth of the family Tortricidae. It is found in the Democratic Republic of the Congo.

References

Moths described in 2004
Olethreutini
Moths of Africa
Endemic fauna of the Democratic Republic of the Congo